Montrose County is a county located in the U.S. state of Colorado. As of the 2020 census, the population was 42,679. The county seat is Montrose, for which the county is named.

Montrose County comprises the Montrose, CO Micropolitan Statistical Area.

Geography

Adjacent counties
 Mesa County - north
 Delta County - northeast
 Gunnison County - east
 Ouray County - southeast
 San Miguel County - south
 San Juan County, Utah - west

Major Highways
  U.S. Highway 50
  U.S. Highway 550
  State Highway 90
  State Highway 92
  State Highway 141
  State Highway 145
  State Highway 348

National protected areas
Black Canyon of the Gunnison National Park
Black Canyon of the Gunnison Wilderness
Curecanti National Recreation Area (part)
Dominguez-Escalante National Conservation Area (part)
Gunnison Gorge National Conservation Area (part)
Gunnison Gorge Wilderness
Gunnison National Forest (part)
Manti-La Sal National Forest (part)
Old Spanish National Historic Trail
Uncompahgre National Forest (part)

River
Dolores River (part)
Uncompahgre River (part)
San Miguel River(part)
Gunnison River (part)

Trails and byways
Great Parks Bicycle Route
Unaweep/Tabeguache Scenic and Historic Byway
West Elk Loop Scenic Byway
Western Express Bicycle Route

Historical site
Hanging Flume
Uravan, Colorado

Demographics

As of the census of 2010, there were 41,276 people, 16,484 households, and 11,461 families residing in the county.  The population density was 18 people per square mile (7/km2).  There were 18,250 housing units at an average density of 8 per square mile (3/km2).  The racial makeup of the county was 86.70% White, 0.40% Black or African American, 1.10% Native American, 0.60% Asian, 0.10% Pacific Islander, 8.70% from other races, and 2.40% from two or more races.  19.70% of the population were Hispanic or Latino of any race.

There were 16,484 households, out of which 31.20% had children under the age of 18 living with them, 56.10% were married couples living together, 9.10% had a female householder with no husband present, and 30.50% were non-families. 25.80% of all households were made up of individuals, and 12.00% had someone living alone who was 65 years of age or older.  The average household size was 2.47 and the average family size was 2.97.

The county population was spread out, with 24.70% under the age of 18, 6.40% from 18 to 24, 22.50% from 25 to 44, 28.60% from 45 to 64, and 17.80% who were 65 years of age or older.  The median age was 42 years. For every 100 females there were 96.00 males.  For every 100 females age 18 and over, there were 94.00 males.

Also from the census of 2010, the median income for a household in the county was $46,058, and the median income for a family was $52,152. Males had a median income of $41,301 versus $31,659 for females. The per capita income for the county was $22,413.  About 7.30% of families and 10.20% of the population were below the poverty line, including 13.40% of those under age 18 and 9.80% of those age 65 or over.

Politics
Montrose is a staunch Republican county. It has not been won by a Democratic Presidential nominee since Lyndon Johnson‘s 1964 landslide – indeed since then, no Democrat has managed forty percent of the county’s vote. The county has leaned Republican ever since 1920; although before this, it did tend to vote Democratic between 1896 and 1916 except during the landslide loss of Alton B. Parker in 1904.

In other offices, Montrose also is strongly Republican. The last Democratic Senatorial candidate it backed was Ben “Nighthorse” Campbell, who was later to shift to the Republican Party, in the 1992 election, and since then no Democratic Senatorial candidate has passed forty percent either. Montrose County did back Constitution Party nominee Tom Tancredo in the 2010 gubernatorial election, and Bill Ritter did win 46 percent in 2006, but Roy Romer in 1990 remains the last Democratic candidate for governor to win Montrose County.

Culture
Ute Indian State History Museum

Communities

City
Montrose

Towns
Naturita
Nucla
Olathe

Census-designated place
Redvale

Other unincorporated places

Bedrock
Cimarron
Coventry
Maher
Mountain View
Oak Grove
Paradox
Pea Green Corner
Pinon
Uravan
Ute

See also

Outline of Colorado
Index of Colorado-related articles
Colorado census statistical areas
Montrose Micropolitan Statistical Area
National Register of Historic Places listings in Montrose County, Colorado

Notes

References

External links
Montrose County Government website
Colorado County Evolution by Don Stanwyck
Colorado Historical Society

 

 
Colorado counties
1883 establishments in Colorado
Populated places established in 1883